Siegfried III, Count of Weimar-Orlamünde (1206) was a member of the House of Ascania and a ruling Count of Weimar-Orlamünde.

He was the son of Count Herman I and his wife Irmgard. Herman I was son of Albert the Bear Count of Anhalt, Margrave of Brandenburg and Duke of Saxony.

He was regarded as a supporter of the House of Hohenstaufen.  He spent some time in Denmark.  He married Sophie (1159 – ), a daughter of King Valdemar I of Denmark and had two sons:
 Albert II
 Herman II

References

Sources

House of Ascania
Counts of Weimar-Orlamünde
Year of birth uncertain
1150s births
1206 deaths
12th-century German nobility